Uberdata (also known as Überdata or Uber data) is a ROM editing software package designed specifically for On Board Diagnostics (OBD) Honda Engine control units. It was created by Blake Warner (also known as Uberteg or Vertigo). In an article Warner states that "Uberdata is, in short, a piece of software that enables you to modify your Honda ECU's code using a Windows-based program".

The current stable release is 1.70 (which was officially released on 24 Oct 04). The future of Uberdata is uncertain because Warner stopped developing the program, but he has released the source code to the open source community.

References

See also
Car tuning
Engine tuning
Foreign branding
Power band

Vehicle modifications